Villadose is a comune (municipality) in the Province of Rovigo in the Italian region Veneto, located about  southwest of Venice and about  east of Rovigo.

The municipality of Villadose contains the località (villages and hamlets) Cambio, Canale di Villadose, and Ca' Tron.

Villadose borders the following municipalities: Adria, Ceregnano, Rovigo, San Martino di Venezze.

Demographic evolution

References

External links 

 www.comune.villadose.ro.it/

Cities and towns in Veneto